In Bosnia and Herzegovina, the smallest administrative unit is the municipality ("opština/општина" or "općina/опћина" in the official languages and scripts of the country). Prior to the 1992–95 Bosnian War there were 109 municipalities in what was then Socialist Republic of Bosnia and Herzegovina. Ten of these formed the area of the capital Sarajevo.

After the war, the number of municipalities was increased to 143, grouped in the following way:
79 municipalities constitute the Federation of Bosnia and Herzegovina (FBiH), which comprises 51% of the country's total territory. The municipalities within the federation are grouped into ten cantons.
64 municipalities constitute the Republika Srpska (RS), which comprises 49% of the country's total territory.

In addition, Brčko District does not belong to either entity and is governed as a condominium of both FBiH and RS entities. The district corresponds to the pre-war Brčko municipality. Although technically not called a municipality, it is treated as such for statistic purposes.

Administratively, each municipality has a municipality council and a municipality head, and they usually consist of an urban area with the surrounding villages and rural areas around it. Bosnia and Herzegovina also has 32 officially designated cities: Banja Luka, Bihać, Tuzla, Mostar, Zenica, Doboj, Prijedor, Bijeljina, Trebinje, Široki Brijeg, Cazin, Goražde, Livno, Zvornik, Gradiška, Živinice, Gračanica, Srebrenik, Gradačac, Visoko, Ljubuški, Čapljina, Derventa, Lukavac, Zavidovići, Konjic, Bosanska Krupa, Orašje, Stolac and Laktaši each correspond to a single eponymous municipality. The cities of Sarajevo and Istočno Sarajevo consist of four and six municipalities respectively, which roughly correspond to the ten pre-war municipalities which constituted the capital city.

History

Socialist Republic 

On 16 August 1945, the Presidency of the National Assembly of Bosnia and Herzegovina enacted the Act on Territorial Division of the Federal Bosnia and Herzegovina on Okrugs, Srezs and the Areas of the Local People's Committees. According to this act, Bosnia and Herzegovina was divided into 7 okrugs – Sarajevo, Herzegovina, Travnik, Banja Luka, Doboj and Travnik.

The new Act on Administrative-Territorial Division was enacted in 1949. The People's Republic of Bosnia and Herzegovina was then divided into four oblasts – Sarajevo, Mostar, Banja Luka and Tuzla .

In 1952, the National Assembly of Bosnia and Herzegovina again changed the local administration by enacting the Act on the Division of the Territory of the People's Republic of Bosnia and Herzegovina. The oblasts were abolished, while the country was divided into 66 srezs, 5 cities and 418 municipalities, of which 53 were city municipalities.

In mid 1955, another law, the Act on the Territory of the Srezs and Municipalities in the People's Republic of Bosnia and Herzegovina, was enacted. From then, Bosnia and Herzegovina was divided into 15 srezs – Banja Luka, Bihać, Brčko, Derventa, Doboj, Goražde, Jajce, Livno, Mostar, Prijedor, Sarajevo, Trebinje, Tuzla, Zenica and Zvornik. Each srez had several municipalities. The seat of the named srezs was in the respective municipalities they were named after. This act was changed in 1958, and the srezs of Derventa, Trebinje and Zvornik were abolished. In 1968, the act was changed again, and Bosnia and Herzegovina was divided into 6 srezs – Banja Luka, Bihać, Doboj, Mostar, Sarajevo and Tuzla.

In 1966 the srezs were abolished, and only the municipalities have remained to this day.

Municipalities of the Federation of Bosnia and Herzegovina

Municipalities of Republika Srpska

See also

 List of populated places in Bosnia and Herzegovina
 List of settlements in the Federation of Bosnia and Herzegovina
 List of cities in Bosnia and Herzegovina

References 

 
Subdivisions of Bosnia and Herzegovina
Bosnia and Herzegovina 3
Bosnia and Herzegovina 3
Municipalities, Bosnia and Herzegovina
Bosnia and Herzegovina geography-related lists